Matthew Scott Murphy (born January 26, 1970) is an American entrepreneur and politician. He represented parts of New York state's Capital District (excluding the city of Albany) in the United States House of Representatives for a portion of one term from April 2009 until January 2011. He was defeated for election to a full term on November 2, 2010.

He is a member of the Democratic Party and was a member of the Blue Dog Coalition in Congress.

Early life, education and career
The son of a teacher and mail carrier, Murphy graduated from the David H. Hickman High School in Columbia, Missouri, in 1988, He later graduated magna cum laude from Harvard College.

Murphy worked for Bankers Trust for two and a half years in the early 1990s before becoming an entrepreneur. In 1994, he co-founded an interactive media company, Small World Software. In 1998 the company, which had grown to 25 employees, was purchased by the internet-consulting company iXL. He then served as one of the heads of the purchased entity, rebranded "iXL New York". iXL later went bankrupt in 2002 during the end of the dot-com bubble. In 2001 Murphy joined Advantage Capital Partners, an Impact Investing Company that attempts to bring businesses, technologies and jobs to communities that have historically lacked access to investment capital.

He is a past-President of the Board of Directors of Upstate Capital Association, (fka Upstate Venture Association of New York, Inc.) He worked as an aide, Deputy Chief of Staff, and fundraiser for former Governors of Missouri Mel Carnahan and Roger B. Wilson.

U.S. House of Representatives

2009 special election

On January 22, 2009, Congresswoman Kirsten Gillibrand, a Democrat representing , was appointed by Governor David Paterson to fill the United States Senate seat vacated by Hillary Clinton, who assumed the office of United States Secretary of State in the Obama administration.

On February 1, 2009, Murphy was chosen by a unanimous vote of ten Democratic county chairs to be their party's nominee for 2009 special election to fill Gillibrand's seat in the House.

Murphy ran against Republican nominee Jim Tedisco from Schenectady, who, until April 2009, was the Minority Leader of the New York State Assembly. Murphy was endorsed by President Barack Obama and Senator Gillibrand.

The initial count from the election had Murphy leading by approximately 60 votes out of more than 150,000 cast. However, by April 24, after re-tallies and absentee ballot counting, Murphy was ahead by 399 votes, and Tedisco conceded the election. Murphy was sworn in on April 29.

Tenure
On November 7, 2009, Murphy voted against the Affordable Health Care for America Act. Murphy opposed the Stupak Amendment, which proposed to restrict federal funding and subsidies for plans that cover elective abortion.

In March 2010, Murphy supported the Patient Protection and Affordable Care Act, known today as Obamacare.

In December 2010, Murphy voted for the Protecting Students from Sexual and Violent Predators Act, which require criminal background checks for school employees and prohibits the employment of school employees who refuse to consent to a criminal background check, make false statements in connection with one, or have been convicted of one of a list of felonies or any other crime that is a violent or sexual crime against a child. The felonies included are homicide, child abuse or neglect, rape or sexual assault, crimes against children, spousal abuse, kidnapping, arson, and physical assault, battery, or drug-related offenses, committed within the past five years.

Committee assignments
Rep. Murphy served on the same two committees as his predecessor, now-Senator Kirsten Gillibrand:
Committee on Agriculture
Subcommittee on Conservation, Credit, Energy, and Research
Subcommittee on Horticulture and Organic Agriculture
Subcommittee on Livestock, Dairy, and Poultry
Committee on Armed Services
Subcommittee on Terrorism and Unconventional Threats
Subcommittee on Strategic Forces

Electoral history

Personal life
Murphy is married to Jennifer Hogan, a native of Washington County. They have three children, Simone, Lux and Duke. All three attend school in New York City while living part time in Glens Falls.

References

External links

1970 births
American computer businesspeople
Harvard College alumni
Hickman High School alumni
Living people
Politicians from Columbia, Missouri
Politicians from Glens Falls, New York
Methodists from New York (state)
Democratic Party members of the United States House of Representatives from New York (state)
Businesspeople from Columbia, Missouri
21st-century American politicians